Several units of the Volunteer Force formed in Middlesex from 1859 shared the number 1:
 1st (Hanover Square) Middlesex Artillery Volunteer Corps
 1st Middlesex Engineers
 1st (Victoria Rifle Club) Middlesex Rifle Volunteer Corps
 1st (Regent Street) Middlesex Light Horse Volunteers